Ningunsaw Provincial Park is a provincial park in British Columbia, Canada.

References

Nass Country
Provincial parks of British Columbia